Amaxia fallaciosa is a moth of the family Erebidae. It was described by Hervé de Toulgoët in 1989. It is found in Mexico.

References

Moths described in 1989
Amaxia
Moths of Central America